"Come Down" is a song by American alternative rock band Toad the Wet Sprocket, released as the first single from their fifth studio album, Coil (1997), in April 1997. The song peaked at number 51 on the US Billboard Hot 100 Airplay chart and number 38 on the Canadian RPM Top Singles chart.

Track listings
US promo CD
 "Come Down" (edit) – 3:03
 "Come Down" (album version) – 3:13

European CD single
 "Come Down" (album version) – 3:13
 "Fall Down" (live) – 3:25
 "Something's Always Wrong" (live) – 4:37
 "Woodburning" (live) – 4:23

Credits and personnel
Credits are adapted from the Coil liner notes.

Studios
 Recorded at Master Control (Los Angeles) and Gopher Sound (Santa Barbara, California)
 Mixed at South Beach Studios (Miami Beach, Florida)
 Mastered at Precision Mastering (Los Angeles)

Personnel

 Toad the Wet Sprocket – music, production
 Glen Phillips – music, lyrics, vocals, guitar
 Todd Nichols – music, lyrics, guitar, vocals
 Dean Dinning – bass, vocals, keyboards
 Randy Guss – drums
 Gavin MacKillop – production, recording

 Carrie McConkey – production coordination
 Jeff Robinson – recording assistant
 Tom Lord-Alge – mixing
 Femio Hernandez – mixing assistant
 Stephen Marcussen – mastering

Charts

References

External links
 Youtube

Toad the Wet Sprocket songs
1997 singles
1997 songs
Columbia Records singles
Songs written by Glen Phillips (singer)
Songs written by Todd Nichols (musician)